Norge i rødt, hvitt og blått (Norway in red, white and blue) is one of Norway's most famous national songs. It is widely used on 17 May, Norway's Constitution Day. The song originates from the time of the German occupation of Norway (1941), with lyrics by Finn Bø, Bias Bernhoft and Arild Feldborg. The melody was composed by Lars-Erik Larsson, originally under the name "Obligationsmarschen", with lyrics by Alf Henrikson, as a work commissioned by the Swedish state.

External links
Sissel Kyrkjebø - Norge i rødt, hvitt og blått - 2020  ; Sissel Kyrkjebø with Norwegian Radio Orchestra (KORK) at TV concert for May 17 2020 Constitution Day (Norway)  ; Hosted by YouTube
 Norge i rødt, hvitt og blått in Store norske leksikon (in Norwegian)
Glittertind - Norge i rødt, hvitt og blått lyrics + English translation

References

Norwegian music
1941 in music
Norwegian songs